was a Japanese geophysicist. He studied geomagnetism.

He won the Gold Medal of the Royal Astronomical Society in 1987. Mount Nagata is named after him.

References

1913 births
1991 deaths
People from Aichi Prefecture
Explorers of Antarctica
20th-century Japanese astronomers
Geophysicists
Academic staff of the University of Tokyo
University of Tokyo alumni
Recipients of the Gold Medal of the Royal Astronomical Society
Recipients of the Order of Culture
Foreign associates of the National Academy of Sciences
Members of the Japan Academy